Colosseum is a retail park in Bucharest, Romania, located in the northwestern part of the city, near Chitila. There are also plans for the construction of a shopping mall.

References

External links
 Official site

Shopping malls in Bucharest